TP Sudhindra (born 24 April 1984) is an Indian first-class cricketer. He is a right-arm medium pace bowler who bowls consistently at around 130 km/h and relies on accuracy, and bats left-handed. He is banned from taking part in any official cricket matches after being found guilty of spot-fixing in domestic matches. He played Ranji Trophy for Madhya Pradesh and represented Delhi Giants and Deccan Chargers in the Indian Cricket League (ICL) and the Indian Premier League (IPL) respectively.

Early career and personal life

Sudhindra was born in Hindupur, Andhra Pradesh to middle-class parents. His family currently resides in Bhilai, Chhattisgarh. He showed an intense dedication towards cricket right from his childhood. In his early playing days Sudhindra used to keep wickets, but subsequently took up bowling on his coach's advice. Sudhindra took a break from cricket during  class 12 to prepare for CBSE board examination. Back in his hometown, Sudhindra resumed playing cricket and was selected to play for Chhattisgarh in the Moin-ud-Dowla Gold Cup. Sudhindra was selected for the MP Under-22 side in 2003. The call-up to the MP senior side arrived in 2005–06, after Sudhindra's impressive performance at the U-22 level.

First Class Cricket

Sudhindra made his first class debut in 2005 against Jharkhand at Indore. He played 27 first-class games, representing Madhya Pradesh in the Ranji Trophy. After returning to domestic Cricket in 2009, Sudhindra picked up 25 wickets for his side in the Plate Division of the Ranji Trophy in the 2010–11 season. His splendid work with the shining and rough ball took Madhya Pradesh to the knockout stage of the Elite Division of the Ranji Trophy in the 2011–12 season. He was the leading wicket-taker for that season with 40 wickets at an average of 18.70.

Indian Cricket League

A precarious financial situation at home forced Sudhindra to look towards the rebel Indian Cricket League. Sudhindra was signed up by the Delhi Giants and also represented the Indian World Team in the ICL. In 2009, he returned to the domestic fray after the BCCI granted amnesty to 79 Indian players who had ended their association with the ICL.

Indian Premier League

Sudhindra earned an IPL contract with Deccan Chargers in 2012 on the back of an impressive Ranji Trophy season for Madhya Pradesh. He played three games for the Chargers in the fifth edition of IPL. Sudhindra had a disastrous outing in the tournament, picking up only one wicket and going for an economy rate of more than 11 in each of his three games. Other bowlers of his team did not fare well either. After his name cropped up in a spot-fixing incident, he was suspended by his franchise pending further enquiry.

Spot-fixing controversy and subsequent ban

On 14 May 2012, Indian television channel India TV aired a sting operation on Sudhindhra to having bowled a no-ball in a domestic game at the TV channel's insistence. The said no-ball was bowled by Sudhindra in the domestic match of Madhya Pradesh Premier League T20 tournament. Following the sting operation, Sudhindra (along with four other domestic players) was suspended by the BCCI pending completion of enquiry. The case was investigated by Ravi Sawani, who submitted his report to the BCCI's disciplinary committee. The committee held Sudhindra guilty of spot-fix in a domestic cricket match, and imposed exemplary penalty of a life-ban on him from playing any cricket matches conducted or authorized by the ICC or BCCI, or any affiliated unit of the BCCI. He will not be entitled to the monthly gratis, benevolent fund, benefit match or any other facility, in lieu of. Further, he cannot hold any position in any cricket association affiliated to the BCCI, for life.

Sudhindra admitted his guilt but plans to raise concern over the stiff penalties imposed on him.

References

External links

Madhya Pradesh thrash Tripura
T Sudhindra
Sudhindra's best catch

1984 births
Living people
Indian cricketers
Madhya Pradesh cricketers
Delhi Giants cricketers
Deccan Chargers cricketers
India Red cricketers
Central Zone cricketers
People from Anantapur district
Cricketers from Andhra Pradesh
Cricketers banned for corruption